This is a list of U.S. counties named after prominent Confederate historical figures. Several counties, all but one of them in states that seceded, are named for Confederate politicians and military officers.

The most common Confederacy-related county names are "Lee County" (for Robert E. Lee) with eight examples, and "Jeff Davis County" or "Jefferson Davis County" (for Jefferson Davis) with four examples. Patrick Cleburne, Alexander Stephens, and Henry A. Wise, have two counties each named after them.

Table

See also
 List of Confederate monuments and memorials which covers counties, cities and other inhabited places named for Confederate leaders

Confederate historical figures
Counties
U.S. counties named after prominent Confederate historical figures
Lost Cause of the Confederacy